Tim Macrow (born 13 May 1984 in Melbourne, Victoria) is an Australian racing driver. He has competed in Australian Formula 3 and Porsche Supercup, winning the Australian Drivers' Championship twice in the former category.

In 2019, Macrow raced in two exhibition rounds to launch the S5000 Series. In 2020, he is set to compete in the inaugural S5000 season.

Macrow is the son of Peter Macrow, brother of Adam Macrow.

Racing record

Complete Porsche Supercup results
(key) (Races in bold indicate pole position) (Races in italics indicate fastest lap)

Complete S5000 results

References

External links
 Official website
 Career statistics from Driver Database

1984 births
Australian Formula 3 Championship drivers
Formula Ford drivers
Living people
Racing drivers from Melbourne
Porsche Supercup drivers

Tasman Series drivers